Coldstream is a Canadian community in Brighton Parish, New Brunswick.

Coldstream is located 6.4 km west of Carlisle, on the road to Hartland. It is next to the Becaguimec Stream.

History

It was settled about 1826. It was first called Rockland and was renamed Coldstream when the post office was created in 1852. In 1866 Coldstream was a farming settlement with about 90 families. In 1871, the community and surrounding district had a population of 400. In 1898 Coldstream was a village with 1 post office, 3 stores, 1 sawmill, 1 hotel, 2 churches and a population of 250. The Post office was closed in 1969. As of the 2011 census, 150 people lived here, a gain from the 2006 census (128).

Notable people

See also
List of communities in New Brunswick

References

Communities in Carleton County, New Brunswick
Designated places in New Brunswick
Local service districts of Carleton County, New Brunswick
Canada geography articles needing translation from French Wikipedia